Soldiers of Fortune is a 1955-1956 syndicated half hour American television adventure series. It starred John Russell as Tim Kelly and Chick Chandler as his sidekick Toubo Smith who were international adventurers. Episodes take place in different countries. Many of the film crew had worked at Republic Pictures studios with the show filmed on Republic's backlot then used by television's Revue Productions. The episodes ran for 52 weeks and were constantly rerun on American television into the 1960s.

Production

The series began as a television pilot called Adventure in Java that was shown on the Chevron Theatre on 10 February 1953. The show starred Tim Holt and Charles Bronson then credited as Charles Buchinsky.

The show was sponsored for two years by 7 Up soft drink with the firm also sending the stars out on national publicity tours.

One year after Soldiers of Fortune was cancelled, John Russell went on to star as Marshal Dan Troup in the successful ABC/Warner Brothers western series Lawman.

DVD release
Timeless Media Group (TMG) released a Region 1 five disc DVD set titled Soldiers of Fortune: The Complete Television Series on November 30, 2010. It includes all 29 episodes of Season 1 and all 23 episodes of Season 2.

Guest stars
Frances Bavier
Andy Clyde in "Hate at Forty Fathoms" (1955)
Carol Thurston as Nari in "Massacre in Mokhara" (1956)
 Uncredited actors include Filipino Hollywood actor Rudy Robles acting on various roles. (1955-1956)

References

External links
 
 Episode guide

1955 American television series debuts
1957 American television series endings
American adventure television series
Black-and-white American television shows
English-language television shows
1950s American drama television series
First-run syndicated television programs in the United States